Laguna del Diamante (Spanish for "lake of the diamond") is a lake located in the province of Mendoza, Argentina, in the San Carlos Department, some 198 km from Mendoza. It covers a surface area of about 14.1 km2 and is one of the largest freshwater resources in the Province. Nearby is Maipo volcano. The volcano and its reflection in the lake forms diamond-shape image, which gives the lake its name.
It is known for its stunning beauty.  However, few get the chance to see it because it is passable only in February and only via an off-road vehicle.

The lake was described by Antoine de Saint Exupéry in his book Wind, Sand and Stars as quoted, "...he [Guillaumet] caught sight of a dark horizontal blot which he recognized as a lake Laguna Diamante".

Lakes of Mendoza Province
Lava dammed lakes
Protected areas of Argentina
Protected areas of Mendoza Province